"Cage" is the 4th single by the Japanese heavy metal band Dir En Grey released on May 26, 1999. The song appeared on Japanese radio stations in the late 1990s such as Music Station. With it receiving all around positive ratings from listeners and critics a-like.

The song "「S」" from the band's previous indie debut EP Missa, was remixed by Chris Vrenna. The same person who remixed "Cage" on the Yokan B-Sides.

Track listing
All lyrics are written by Kyo; Music composed by Dir En Grey.

Personnel 
 Dir En Grey
 Kyo – vocals, lyricist
 Kaoru – guitar
 Die – guitar
 Toshiya – bass guitar
 Shinya – drums
 Yoshiki Hayashi – producer
 Chris Vrenna - remixing

Chart position

References 

1999 singles
Dir En Grey songs
Songs written by Kyo (musician)
1999 songs
East West Records singles